Charles Augustus, Hereditary Grand Duke of Saxe-Weimar-Eisenach (Carl August Wilhelm Ernst Friedrich Georg Johann Albrecht; 28 July 1912 – 14 October 1988), was a German prince and head of the grand ducal house of Saxe-Weimar-Eisenach.

Life
He was born in Schloss Wilhelmsthal as the eldest son and heir of Wilhelm Ernst, Grand Duke of Saxe-Weimar-Eisenach, and his second wife, Princess Feodora of Saxe-Meiningen. His father's reign came to an end on 9 November 1918, as a result of the German revolution.

When his father died on 24 April 1923, Charles Augustus succeeded him as head of the House of Saxe-Weimar-Eisenach. Until 1922, Charles Augustus was third in line to the throne of the Kingdom of the Netherlands.

Charles Augustus died at Schienen and was succeeded as head of the grand ducal house by his son, Michael.

Marriage and issue
Charles Augustus was married at the Wartburg Castle on 5 October 1944 to Baroness Elisabeth of Wangenheim-Winterstein (Tübingen, 16 January 1912 – Munich, 15 March 2010), daughter of Othmar Baron von Wangenheim-Winterstein and wife, Baroness Maud von Trützschler. They had three children: 
 Princess Elisabeth of Saxe-Weimar-Eisenach (22 July 1945); she married Mindert Diderik de Kant on 10 July 1981 and they were divorced in 1983. 
 Michael, Prince of Saxe-Weimar-Eisenach (15 November 1946); he married Renate Henkel on 4 July 1970 and they were divorced in 1974. He remarried Dagmar Hennings in 1980. They have one daughter.
 Princess Beatrice-Maria of Saxe-Weimar-Eisenach (11 March 1948); she married Martin Davidson on 9 December 1977. They have one daughter:
 Bettina Davidson (1979)

Ancestry

|-

1912 births
1988 deaths
House of Saxe-Weimar-Eisenach
Princes of Saxe-Weimar-Eisenach
People from Eisenach
Heirs apparent who never acceded
Hereditary Grand Dukes of Saxe-Weimar-Eisenach
House of Wettin
Child pretenders
Sons of monarchs